Bo Svenson (born Bo Ragnar Svensson; 13 February 1941) is a Swedish-American actor, film director, film producer, published author and award winning screenwriter, known for his roles in American genre films of the 1970s and 1980s. He has appeared in two Quentin Tarantino movies.

Early life
Svenson was born in Sweden the son of Birger Ragnar Svensson (1917–?), an athlete and the personal driver and bodyguard for the King of Sweden, and musician/big band leader Iris Viola "Lola" Svensson (1912–1998).

Svenson emigrated to the United States when he was 17, joined the United States Marine Corps, and served until his honorable discharge six years later. After his military service, Svenson settled in Florida, where he earned his living in various jobs, including professional race car driver.  His first state of residence in the United States was Georgia, where he became familiar with the rural Southern accent he later employed in some of his roles. He has since become a naturalized United States citizen.

He also holds a fourth degree (Yondan) black belt in judo. He earned his first degree (Shodan) belt at Kodokan in Japan, the home dojo of Judo, while stationed in Japan in 1961 as a Marine. He was the 1961 Far East Judo Champion in the Heavyweight Division.

Career
In the late 1960s, Svenson had a recurring role in the hit TV series Here Come the Brides as Lumberjack Olaf "Big Swede" Gustavsen. He appeared in the 1973 made-for-TV movie Frankenstein, in which he plays the "Creature".  

One of his first big-screen movie roles was opposite Robert Redford in The Great Waldo Pepper, where Redford and Svenson play rival ex-WWI U.S. Army Air Service pilots who are now employed in the hard and dangerous but wildly adventurous lives of 1920s barnstorming pilots, touring the Midwest.

In his next pursuit, Svenson took over the role of lawman Buford Pusser from Joe Don Baker in both sequels to the hit 1973 film Walking Tall, after Pusser himself, who had originally agreed to take over the role, died in an automobile crash. He reprised the role again for the short-lived 1981 television series of the same name.

One of his most famous roles in films was as murder-witness-turned-vigilante Michael McBain in the 1976 cult classic Breaking Point. He played the Soviet agent Ivan in the Magnum, P.I. episode "Did You See the Sunrise?" (1982) and many years later had a cameo as an American colonel in Inglourious Basterds, as a tribute to his role in The Inglorious Bastards; he is the only actor to appear in both films.

Svenson got name-checked by Breaking Bad's Mike Ehrmantraut.

Work with Fred Williamson
Svenson has co-starred in a number of films with Fred Williamson. They include, The Inglorious Bastards (1978), Deadly Impact (1984),  Delta Force Commando (1987), The Kill Reflex (1989), Three Days to a Kill (1991),   and Steele's Law (1991)

Outside acting
Svenson maintains an active role in the entertainment industry and is the Founder and CEO of MagicQuest Entertainment, a Hollywood production company since 1975, and Founder and CEO of CanAm Film Corp., a British Columbia corporation since 1992.

Interviews
 Interview from The Quentin Tarantino Archives, tarantino.info; accessed 20 August 2015.

Filmography

Actor

Director

Producer

Writer

References

External links 
 
 

1941 births
American male film actors
American male judoka
American male television actors
American voice directors
Swedish voice directors
Living people
Naturalized citizens of the United States
People from Gothenburg
Swedish emigrants to the United States
Swedish male film actors
Swedish male judoka
Swedish male television actors
University of California, Los Angeles alumni